Mike Jaros was a Democratic Farmer Labor Party member of the Minnesota House of Representatives, representing District 7B from 1984 to 2009. He had also previously served from 1972 to 1980. Jaros decided not to seek reelection on June 16, 2008.  Liz Olson currently represents District 7B.

He wrote an article in the East European Genealogist in 2005 examining his own family tree, which consisted of Galician Poles.

References

External links
Minnesota Legislative Reference Library - Mike Jaros
Minnesota Public Radio - Votetracker: Mike Jaros voting record
Project Vote Smart - Representative Mike Jaros (MN) profile
Follow the Money - Mike Jaros
2006 2004 2002 2000 1998 1996 campaign contributions

Democratic Party members of the Minnesota House of Representatives
1944 births
Living people
American politicians of Polish descent
21st-century American politicians